The 1978 Cork Intermediate Hurling Championship was the 69th staging of the Cork Intermediate Hurling Championship since its establishment by the Cork County Board in 1909. The draw for the opening round fixtures took place at the Cork Convention on 5 February 1978. The championship ran from 7 May to 13 August 1978.

On 13 August 1978, Midleton won the championship following a 1–12 to 1–10 defeat of Newtownshandrum in the final at Páirc Mac Gearailt. This was their third championship title overall and their first title since 1962.

Results

First round

 Midleton received a bye in this round.

Quarter-finals

Semi-finals

Final

References

Cork Intermediate Hurling Championship
Cork Intermediate Hurling Championship